Megaphragma  is a wasp genus in the family Trichogrammatidae. It contains two of the four smallest known insects, Megaphragma caribea (170 μm) and Megaphragma mymaripenne (200 μm).

References

External links 

Trichogrammatidae
Taxa named by Philip Hunter Timberlake